This is a list of the butterflies of China belonging to the family Lycaenidae and an index to the species articles. This forms part of the full list of butterflies of China. 428 species or subspecies of Lycaenidae are recorded from China.

Lycaenidae
genus: Acupicta
Acupicta hainanicum Sugiyama, 1992  Hainan, Mount Wuzhi
genus: Acytolepis
Acytolepis puspa (Horsfield, [1828])
A. p. myla (Fruhstorfer, 1909) Formosa
A. p. hermagoras (Fruhstorfer, 1910) Hainan
A. p. gisca  (Fruhstorfer, 1910) South China
genus: Afarsia
Afarsia antoninae (Lukhtanov, 1999) Tian-Shan
Afarsia sieversii (Christoph, 1873)
A. s. haberhaueri  (Staudinger, 1886) Tien-Shan
A. s. gorana (Tshikolovets, 1997) Tien-Shan
genus: Agriades
Agriades amphirrhoe (Oberthür, 1910) Tibet
Agriades arcaseia (Fruhstorfer, 1916) Tibet
Agriades dis  (Grum-Grshimailo, 1891) Central Asia
Agriades janigena  (Riley, 1923) Himalayas, Everest region
Agriades lehanus  (Moore, 1878)
Agriades luana  (Evans, 1915) Tibet
Agriades morsheadi  (Evans, 1923) Tibet
Agriades optilete (Knoch, 1781)
Agriades orbitulus (de Prunner, 1798)
A. o. luxurians (Forster, 1940) Yunnan
A. o. tatsienluica (Oberthür, 1910) Tibet
A. o. major  (Evans, 1915) Tibet
A. o. pheretimus  (Staudinger, 1892) Northwest China
A. o. shanxiensis  Murayama, 1983 Shanxi
A. o. tyrone  (Forster, 1940) Gansu
A. o. sajana  (Heyne, 1895)
A. o. qinlingensis  (Wang, 1998) Qinling Mountains
A. o. tibetana (D'Abrera, 1993) Tibet
A. o. demulaensis (Huang, 2001) Tibet
A. o. dongdalaensis (Huang, 2001) Tibet
A. o. litangensis (Huang, 2001) Sichuan
Agriades orbona (Grum-Grshimailo, 1891)
Agriades pheretiades (Eversmann, 1843)
Agriades shahidulla (Yoshino, 2003) Xinjian
Agriades sikkima (Bath, 1900) TL Sikkim
genus: Allotinus
Allotinus drumila (Moore, [1866])
A. d. aphthonius Fruhstorfer, 1914 Yunnan
genus: Ahlbergia
Ahlbergia chalybeia (Leech, 1890) Hupeh, Szechwan
Ahlbergia chalcidis Chou & Li, 1994 Yunnan
Ahlbergia bimaculata Johnson, 1992 Szechwan, Yunnan
Ahlbergia korea Johnson, 1992 Amurland, Northeast China
Ahlbergia leei Johnson, 1992 Amurland, China
Ahlbergia arquata Johnson, 1992 Tian-Shan
Ahlbergia pluto (Leech, 1893)
A. p. pluto (Leech, 1893) Sichuan
A. p. cyanusJohnson, 1992 Yunnan
Ahlbergia clarofacia Johnson, 1992Sichuan, Yunnan
A. c. meridionalis Huang, 2003 Yunnan
Ahlbergia aleucopuncta Johnson, 1992 Szechwan, Yunnan, Tibet, Amurland
Ahlbergia unicolora Johnson, 1992Yunnan
Ahlbergia pictila Johnson, 1992 Tibet
Ahlbergia caerulea Johnson, 1992
Ahlbergia zhujianhuai Huang & Wu, 2003 South Sichuan
Ahlbergia frivaldszkyi aquilonaria Johnson, 1992 Northeast China, Manchuria
Ahlbergia circe (Leech, 1893) Tibet, Yunnan, Szecwan
Ahlbergia prodiga Johnson, 1992 Yunnan
Ahlbergia caesius Johnson, 1992 East Tibet West Szechwan
Ahlbergia lynda Johnson, 1992
A. l. lynda Johnson, 1992 Sichuan
A. l. nidadana Huang, 2003 Yunnan
Ahlbergia nicevillei (Leech, 1893) Hupeh, West Yunnan
Ahlbergia hsui Johnson, 2000 South Gansu
Ahlbergia distincta Huang, 2003 Yunnan
Ahlbergia clarolinea  H. Huang & A.M. Chen, 2006.
Ahlbergia oppocoenosa  Johnson, 1992  Tibet
genus: Allotinus
Allotinus drumila  (Moore, [1866]) 
genus: Alpherakya
Alpherakya sarta (Alphéraky, 1881)
A. s. laziensis (Huang, 1998) Tibet
genus: Antigius
Antigius attilia (Bremer, 1861)
Antigius butleri (Fenton, 1881)
A. b. miniakonga Yoshino, 1999 Sichuan
Antigius cheni  Koiwaya, 2004  Sichuan, Tianquan
Antigius jinpingi  Y.F. Hsu, 2009  Taiwan
genus: Amblopala
Amblopala avidiena (Hewitson, 1877)
A. a. avidiena (Hewitson, 1877) China
A. a. pherenice Fruhstorfer, 1915 Sichuan
A. a. y-fasciata (Sonan) Taiwan
genus: Amblypodia
Amblypodia anita Hewitson, 1862
A. a. hainana Crowley, 1900 Hainan
genus: Ancema
Ancema ctesia (Hewitson, 1865)
A. c. ctesia (Hewitson, 1865) West China
A. c. cakravasti (Fruhstorfer, 1909) Taiwan
Ancema blanka (de Nicéville, 1894)
A. b. blanka de Nicéville, 1894)
genus: Anthene
Anthene emolus (Godart, [1824])
A. e. emolus (Godart, [1824]) South China, Hainan, South Yunnan
A. e. goberus (Fruhstorfer, 1916) Hainan
Anthene lycaenina (Felder, 1868)
A. l. lycambes (Hewitson, 1878) South Yunnan 
genus: Araotes
Araotes lapithis lapithis  (Moore 1857) Yunnan
genus: Araragi
Araragi enthea (Janson, 1877)
A. e. entheoides (Oberthür, 1914) Sichuan
Araragi sugiyamai Matsui, 1989 Szechuan
A. s. zhejiangana Tong, 1994 Zhejiang
Araragi panda Hsu & Chou, 2001
genus: Arhopala
Arhopala arvina (Hewitson, 1863)
Arhopala japonica (Murray, 1875)
A. j. kotoshona (Sonan, 1947) Taiwan
Arhopala bazaloides (Hewitson, 1878)
Arhopala centaurus (Fabricius, 1775)
A. c. nakula (C. & R. Felder, 1860) Hainan, Yunnan
A. c. pirithous (Moore, [1884]) South China
Arhopala oenea (Hewitson, 1869) Sikkim Yunnan
Arhopala aida de Nicéville, 1889 Hainan
Arhopala rama (Kollar, [1844])
A. r. rama (Kollar, [1844]) Yunnan
Arhopala bazalus (Hewitson, 1862)
A. b. teesta  (de Nicéville, 1886) West China
Arhopala eumolphus (Cramer, [1780]) Hainan
Arhopala hellenore Doherty, 1889 Hainan
Arhopala ganesa (Leech, 1890)
A. g. seminigra (Leech, 1890) West China, Hainan
Arhopala ammonides bowringi (Evans, 1957) Hainan
A. a. bowringi (Evans, 1957) Hainan
Arhopala singla (de Nicéville, 1885)
Arhopala paramuta (de Nicéville, [1884])
Arhopala paraganesa (de Nicéville, 1882)
A. p. paraganesa (de Nicéville, 1882)
Arhopala hellenoroides Chou & Gu, 1994 Hainan
Arhopala qiongdaoensis Chou & Gu, 1994 Hainan
Arhopala aberrans (de Nicéville, [1889]) West China
Arhopala birmana (Moore, [1884])
A. b. birmana (Moore, [1884]) Hong Kong
A. b. asakurae (Matsumura, 1910) Taiwan
Arhopala comica  de Nicéville, 1900 
Arhopala perimuta  Moore, 1857 
genus: Aricia
Aricia agestis (Denis & Schiffermüller, 1775) Tian-Shan
Aricia artaxerxes (Fabricius, 1793)
A. a. scytissa Nekrutenko, 1985 Tian-Shan
A. a. allous  (Geyer, [1834-1836])
Aricia chinensis chinensis (Murray, 1874)
Aricia berezowskii Grum-Grshimailo, 1902 Sichuan
genus: Athamanthia
Athamanthia athamantis  (Eversmann, 1854) 
Athamanthia dilutior  (Staudinger, 1881)
genus: Artipe
Artipe eryx (Linnaeus, 1771)
A. e. eryx (Linnaeus, 1771) South China
A. e. horiella (Matsumura, 1929) Taiwan
genus: Artopoetes
Artopoetes pryeri (Murray, 1873)
Artopoetes praetextatus  (Fujioka, 1992) 
genus: Bindahara
Bindahara phocides  (Fabricius 1793) Yunnan
genus: Bothrinia
Bothrinia nebulosa (Leech, 1890)
B. n. nebulosa (Leech, 1890) West China, Central China
B. n. leechi Forster, 1941 Sichuan
genus: Caerulea
Caerulea coeligena (Oberthür, 1876) West China, Central China
Caerulea coelestis (Alphéraky, 1897) West China, Tibet
genus: Caleta
Caleta elna (Hewitson, 1876)
C. e. noliteia (Fruhstorfer, 1918) South Yunnan, Hainan
Caleta roxus (Godart, [1824])
C. r. roxana (de Nicéville, 1897) Yunnan
genus: Callophrys
Callophrys rubi (Linnaeus, 1758)
genus: Castalius
Castalius rosimon (Fabricius, 1775)
genus: Catochrysops
Catochrysops panormus (C. Felder, 1860)
C. p. exiguus (Distant, 1886) Taiwan, South Yunnan
Catochrysops strabo (Fabricius, 1793)
genus: Catapaecilma
Catapaecilma major Druce, 1895
C. m. major Druce, 1895
C. m. moltrechti (Wileman, 1908) Taiwan
genus: Celastrina
Celastrina argiolus (Linnaeus, 1758)
C. a. bieneri Forster, 1941 Yunnan
Celastrina sugitanii (Matsumura, 1919)
Celastrina gigas (Hemming, 1928)
C. g. fujianensis Huang, 1994 Fujian
Celastrina lavendularis (Moore, 1877)
Celastrina morsheadi (Evans, 1915) Tibet
Celastrina perplexa Eliot & Kawazoé, 1983 Ta-Tsien-Lou
Celastrina filipjevi (Riley, 1934)
Celastrina oreas (Leech, 1893)
C. o. baileyi  Eliot & Kawazoé, 1983 Tibet
C. o. yunnana Eliot & Kawazoé, 1983 Yunnan
Celastrina hersilia (Leech, [1893])
C. h. hersilia (Leech, [1893]) China
Celastrina huegeli (Moore, 1882)
Celastrina melaena  (Doherty, 1889) 
genus: Celatoxia
Celatoxia marginata (de Nicéville, [1884])
C. m. marginata (de Nicéville, [1884]) Yunnan, Formosa
genus: Charana
Charana mandarinus (Hewitson, 1863)
genus: Cheritrella
Cheritrella truncipennis de Nicéville, 1887 West China, Hunnan
genus: Chilades
Chilades lajus (Stoll, [1780])
C. l. lajus (Stoll, [1780]) Hong Kong, Hainan
Chilades yunnanensis Watkins, 1927 Yung Chang
genus: Chliaria
Chliaria kina (Hewitson, 1869)
C. k. kina (Hewitson, 1869)
Chliaria othona (Hewitson, 1865)
C. o. othona Hewitson, 1869
genus: Chrysozephyrus
Chrysozephyrus smaragdinus (Bremer, 1861)
C. s. smaragdinus (Bremer, 1861) Shaanxi, Sichuan
C. s. yunnanensis (Howarth, 1957) Yunnan
Chrysozephyrus brillantinus (Staudinger, 1887)
C. b. brillantinus (Staudinger, 1887) Northeast China
Chrysozephyrus scintillans (Leech, 1894) Yunnan, Szechwan, Kwangtung, Chekiang
C. s. choui ( Tong, 1994 Zhejiang
C. s. hainanensis Wang & Gu, 1997 Hainan
Chrysozephyrus leigongshanensis Chou & Li, 1994 Guizhou
Chrysozephyrus kuromon (Sugiyama, 1994) Sichuan
Chrysozephyrus parakuromon Huang, 2001 Tibet
Chrysozephyrus chinensis (Howarth, 1957) Szechwan
Chrysozephyrus marginatus (Howarth, 1957) Sichuan, Sichuan, Shaanxi
Chrysozephyrus nigroapicalis (Howarth, 1957)
Chrysozephyrus souleana (Riley, 1939) Tibet, West China
Chrysozephyrus tatsienluensis (Murayama, 1955)
Chrysozephyrus tienmushanus Shirôzu & Yamamoto, 1956
Chrysozephyrus kabrua konga Yoshino, 1999 Sichuan
C. k. niitakanus (Kano, 1928) Taiwan
C. k. neidhoeferi  Shimonoya & Murayama, 1971 Taiwan
C. k. konga Yoshino, 1999 Sichuan
Chrysozephyrus vittatus (Tytler, 1915)
Chrysozephyrus duma (Hewitson, 1869)
C. d. desgodinsi (Oberthür, 1886) West China, Szechwan, Yunnan
Chrysozephyrus disparatus (Howarth, 1957)
C. d. disparatus Howarth 1957
C. d. pseudotaiwanus Howarth 1957
C. d. hainanus Wang & Gu, 1997 Hainan
Chrysozephyrus mushaellus (Matsumura, 1938)
C. m. rileyi (Forster, 1940) West China, Jiangxi
Chrysozephyrus sakura Sugiyama, 1992
C. s. meili Yoshino, 1999 Yunnan
Chrysozephyrus teisoi Sonan 1941
Chrysozephyrus sikkimensis Howarth 1957
Chrysozephyrus rarasanus Matsumura 1939
Chrysozephyrus nishikaze Araki & Shibatani 1941
C. m. mushaellus Matsumura, 1938
Chrysozephyrus lingi Okano & Ohkura
Chrysozephyrus leii Chou
Chrysozephyrus hisamatsusanus Nagami & Ishiga 1937
C. h. splendidulus Murayama, 1965 Formosa
Chrysozephyrus morishitai Chou & Zhu, 1994
C. d. pseudotaiwanus (Howarth, 1957)
Chrysozephyrus shimizui  Yoshino, 1997  Guizhou, Mount Fanjinshan
Chrysozephyrus setohi  Koiwaya, 1996  Sichuan, Daba Shan
Chrysozephyrus zoa  (de Nicéville, 1889)
Chrysozephyrus sakula  H. Sugiyama, 1992 Sichuan, Mount Sigunyang
Chrysozephyrus yoshikoae  Koiwaya, 1993  Shaanxi, Chang'an
Chrysozephyrus linae  Koiwaya, 1993   Shaanxi, Zhouzhi Xian 
Chrysozephyrus gaoi  Koiwaya, 1993 Shaanxi, Zhouzhi Xian
Chrysozephyrus tienmushanus  Shirôzu & Yamamoto, 1956 Chekiang
Chrysozephyrus watsoni  (W.H. Evans, 1927) 
Chrysozephyrus inthanonensis  Murayama & Kimura, 1990 
Chrysozephyrus yuchingkinus  Murayama & Shimonoya, 1960  Taiwan
Chrysozephyrus paona  (Tytler, 1915)
Chrysozephyrus dumoides  (Tytler, 1915) 
Chrysozephyrus esakii  (Sonan, 1940) Formosa
genus: Cigaritis
Cigaritis rukma (de Nicéville, [1889]) Yunnan
Cigaritis acamas (Klug, 1834)
Cigaritis lohita (Horsfield, [1829]
C. n. batina  (Fruhstorfer, [1912])  Yunnan
Cigaritis syama (Horsfield, [1829])
C. s. sepulveda (Fruhstorfer, 1912) West China, Central China
C. s. peguanus (Moore, 1884) Yunnan
C. s. hainana (Eliot) Hainan
Cigaritis zhengweille Huang ? Yunan
C. z. chayuensis (Huang, 2001) Tibet
Cigaritis leechi Swinhoe, 1912 West China
Cigaritis takanonis (Matsumura, 1906) West China, Central China
Cigaritis kuyaniana  Matsumura,  Taiwan
Cigaritis rukmini  (de Nicéville，[1889])  
Cigaritis zhengweilie  Huang, 1998   Yunnan 
genus: Cissatsuma
Cissatsuma albilinea (Riley, 1939) Southwest China, Tibet
Cissatsuma kansuensis Johnson, 1992 Kansu
Cissatsuma halosa Johnson, 1992 Yunnan, Szechuan, Kansu, Tainghai, Tibet
Cissatsuma tuba Johnson, 1992 Yunnan
Cissatsuma crenata Johnson, 1992 Yunnan
Cissatsuma contexta Johnson, 1992 Wui-si, Yunnan 
genus: Cordelia
Cordelia minerva (Leech, 1890) West China
Cordelia comes (Leech, 1890)
C . c. comes (Leech, 1890) West China, Central China
C. c. wilemaniella (Matsumura, 1929) Taiwan
Cordelia kitawakii  Koiwaya, 1996  Sichuan, Dabashan
genus: Coreana
Coreana raphaelis (Oberthur, 1881) Northeast China
genus: Creon
Creon cleobis (Godart, [1824]) 
genus: Cupido
Cupido buddhista (Alphéraky, 1881) Tian-Shan, Northwest China
Cupido minimus (Fuessly, 1775) Tian-Shan
Cupido osiris (Meigen, 1829) Tian-Shan
Cupido gisela (Püngeler, 1901) Tibet
Cupido lacturnus (Godart, [1824])
Cupido argiades (Pallas, 1771)
C. a. hellotia (Ménétriés, 1857) Heilongjiang, Liaoning, Jilin, North China (Beijing, Hebei, Shandong, Henan, Shaanxi), Sichuan, Jiangsu, Zhejiang, Shanghai, Fujian, Hunan
C. a. merisina (Lorkovic, 1943) Guangdong
C. a. tibetanus (Lorkovic, 1943) Yunnan
C. a. nujiangensis  (Huang, 2001) Tibet
C. a. chayuensis (Huang, 2001) Tibet
Cupido prosecusa  (Erschoff, 1874) 
genus: Curetis
Curetis bulis (Westwood, 1852)
C. b. doxa Evans, 1954 Hainan
Curetis acuta Moore, 1877
C. a. acuta Moore, 1877 China
C. a. dentata Moore, 1879 South China, West China
C. a. denta Evans, 1954 Hainan
Curetis naga Evans, 1954
Curetis saronis Moore, 1877
Curetis brunnea Wileman, 1909 Taiwan
genus: Cyaniris
Cyaniris semiargus (Rottemburg, 1775)
C. s. altaiana Tutt, 1909 Tian Shan
C. s. amurensis Tutt, 1909 Amur, Ussuri
genus: Dacalana
Dacalana cotys (Hewitson, 1865)
genus: Deudorix
Deudorix hainana Chou & Gu, 1994 Hainan
Deudorix epijarbas (Moore, 1857)
D. e. menesicles Fruhstorfer, 1912 Taiwan
Deudorix hypargyria (Elwes, [1893])
Deudorix rapaloides (Naritomi, 1941) Taiwan
Deudorix sankakuhonis Matsumura, 1938 Taiwan
Deudorix pseudorapaloides  M. Wang & I. Chou, 1997 Guangxi Province
genus: Discolampa
Discolampa ethion (Westwood, 1851)
D. e. ethion (Westwood, 1851) Hainan
genus: Esakiozephyrus
Esakiozephyrus icana (Moore, [1875])
E. i. setschuanica (Riley, 1939) Szechwan
E. i. dimuwa (Yoshino, 1995) Yunnan
E. i. paiensis Huang, 2000 Tibet
Esakiozephyrus longicaudatus Huang, 2001 Tibet
Esakiozephyrus vallonia (Oberthür, 1914) West China
Esakiozephyrus neis (Oberthür, 1914) West China
Esakiozephyrus tsangkie (Oberthür, 1886) Tibet
Esakiozephyrus ackeryi (Fujioka, 1994) Shaanxi, Qinling Mountains
Esakiozephyrus bieti (Oberthür, 1886)
E. b. bieti (Oberthür, 1886) Tibet
E. b. takanamii (Huang, 2000) Yunnan
E. b. mangkangensis Huang, 2001 East Tibet
Esakiozephyrus mandara (Doherty, 1886)
E. m. major Huang, 1998 Tibet
Esakiozephyrus zhengi Huang, 1998 Tibet
Esakiozephyrus neis (Oberthür, 1914) West China
genus: Euaspa
Euaspa milionia (Hewitson, 1869) Formosa
Euaspa forsteri (Esaki & Shirôzu, 1943) Formosa
Euaspa tayal (Esaki & Shirôzu, 1943) Formosa
genus: Euchrysops
Euchrysops cnejus (Fabricius, 1798)
genus: Eumedonia
Eumedonia annulata (Elwes, 1906) Tibet
Eumedonia eumedon (Esper, 1780)
E. e. ambigua (Staudinger, 1899) Tian-Shan
Eumedonia lamasem  (Oberthür, 1910)
Eumedonia persephatta (Alphéraky, 1881) Tian-Shan
genus: Famegana
Famegana alsulus  (Herrich-Schäffer, 1869)
F. a. eggletoni   (Corbet, 1941)  Hong Kong
genus: Favonius
Favonius cognatus (Staudinger, 1892) Northeast China
Favonius korshunovi (Dubatolov & Sergeev, 1982) Northeast China
Favonius leechi (Riley, 1939) Szechwan
Favonius orientalis (Murray, 1875) Northeast China.
Favonius taxila (Bremer, 1861) Northeast China
Favonius ultramarinus (Fixsen, 1887) Northeast China
Favonius saphirinus (Staudinger, 1887) Northeast China
genus: Flos
Flos asoka (de Nicéville, [1884]) Southwest China, Hong Kong.
Flos areste (Hewitson, 1862) Chekiang, Kawang Tung
Flos chinensis (C. & R. Felder, [1865]) Southwest China, Shanghai 
Flos diardi  (Hewitson, 1862) 
Flos adriana  de Nicéville，[1883] 
Flos yunnanensis  ? 
genus: Freyeria
Freyeria putli (Kollar, [1844])
Freyeria trochylus  (Freyer, 1845) 
genus: Glabroculus
Glabroculus cyane  (Eversmann, 1837)
genus: Glaucopsyche
Glaucopsyche alexis (Poda, 1761)
G. a. alexis (Poda, 1761) Tian Shan
Glaucopsyche lycormas (Butler, 1866)
G. l. lycormas (Butler, 1866) Northeast China
genus: Gonerilia
Gonerilia thespis (Leech, 1890) West China, Tibet
Gonerilia seraphim (Oberthür, 1886)
G. s. seraphim (Oberthür, 1886) Sichuan
G. s. mekong Yoshino, 1999 Yunnan
Gonerilia budda (Sugiyama, 1992) West China
Gonerilia okamurai  (Koiwaya, 1996) 
Gonerilia pesthis  (Wang & Chou, 1998) 
genus: Heliophorus
Heliophorus epicles (Godart, [1824])
H. e. latilimbata Eliot, 1963 South Yunnan
H. e. phoenicoparyphus (Holland, 1887) Hainan
Heliophorus ila (de Nicéville & Martin, [1896])
H. i. chinensis (Fruhstorfer, 1908) West China
H. i. urius Eliot, 1963 South Yunnan
Heliophorus kohimensis (Tytler, 1912) Yunnan
Heliophorus brahma (Moore, [1858])
H. b. mogoka Evans, 1932 Yunnan
Heliophorus androcles (Westwood, 1851)
H. a. androcles (Westwood, 1851) West China
H. a. trilunulata Huang, 1999 Tibet
H. a. rubida Riley, 1929 Yunnan
Heliophorus viridipunctata (de Nicéville, 1890)
H. v. viridipunctata (de Nicéville, 1890) West China
H. v. naxi  Yoshino, 1997 Yunnan
Heliophorus moorei (Hewitson, 1865)
H. m. moorei  (Hewitson, 1865) Tibet
Heliophorus saphirioides Murayama, 1992
Heliophorus pulcher Chou, 1994 Sichuan
Heliophorus saphir (Blanchard, 1871)
Heliophorus yunnani D'Abrera, 1993 Yunnan
Heliophorus delacouri Eliot, 1963 South China
Heliophorus stotzneri (Draeseke, 1925) Sichuan
Heliophorus eventa Fruhstorfer, 1918 Yunnan
Heliophorus gloria Huang, 1999 China, Hanmi, Metok, 1800-2300 m.
Heliophorus indicus  Fruhstorfer, 1908 
Heliophorus brilliantinus  H. Huang, 1999 Yunnan
Heliophorus tamu  (Kollar, 1844)
genus: Horaga
Horaga syrinx (C. Felder, 1860)
Horaga onyx (Moore, [1858])
H. o. moltrechti Matsumura, 1919 Taiwan, Hong Kong
Horaga albimacula (Wood-Mason & de Nicéville, 1881)
H. a. triumphali s Murayama & Sibatani, 1943 Taiwan
Horaga rarasana Sonan, 1936 Taiwan
genus: Howarthia
Howarthia watanabei Koiwaya, 1993 Hainan
Howarthia caelestis (Leech, 1890)
H. c. elegans Sugiyama, 1997 West China
Howarthia courvoisieri (Oberthür, 1908) West China
Howarthia cheni Chou & Wang, 1997
Howarthia melli (Forster, 1940) Kwangtung
Howarthia nigricans (Leech, 1893)
genus: Hypolycaena
Hypolycaena vanavasa (Fruhstorfer, 1909)Taiwan
Hypolycaena erylus (Godart, [1824])
H. e. himavantusFruhstorfer, 1912 South Yunnan 
Hypolycaena othona madana (Fruhstorfer, [1912]) Yunnan
genus: Iolana 
Iolana gigantea (Grum-Grshimailo, 1885) 
genus: Ionolyce 
Ionolyce helicon merguiana (Moore, 1884) Yunnan
genus: Iraota
Iraota timoleon (Stoll, [1790])
I. t. timoleon(Stoll, [1790]) South China
genus: Iratsume
Iratsume orsedice (Butler, [1882])
I. o. suzukii (Sonan, 1940) Taiwan
genus: Jacoona
Jacoona fabronia  (Hewitson 1878) 
genus: Jamides
Jamides bochus (Stoll, [1782])
J. b. bochus Yunnan
J. b. plato (Fabricius, 1793) China
Jamides celeno (Cramer, [1775])
J. c. aelianus (Fabricius, 1793) Yunnan
Jamides alecto (Felder, 1860)
J. a. alocina Swinhoe, 1915 South China
Jamides elpis  (Godart, [1824]) 
Jamides pura  (Moore, 1886) 
genus: Japonica
Japonica saepestriata (Hewitson, 1865)
J. s. takenakakazuoi  Fujioka, 1993 Central China
Japonica lutea (Hewitson, 1865)
J. l. dubatolovi Fujioka, 1993 Northeast China
J. l. adusta (Riley, 1939) Sichuan, Tibet
J. l. tatsienluica (Riley, 1939) Szechuan
J. l. patungkoanui  Murayama, 1956 Taiwan
Japonica bella Hsu, 1997 (Nanlingozephyrus) 
genus: Kretania
Kretania pylaon  (Fischer von Waldheim, 1832) 
Kretania usbekus Forster, 1939 Tian Shan
genus: Lampides
Lampides boeticus (Linnaeus, 1767)
genus: Leptotes
Leptotes plinius (Fabricius, 1793
genus: Lestranicus
Lestranicus transpectus  (Moore, 1879)
genus: Leucantigius
Leucantigius atayalica (Shirôzu & Murayama, 1943)
L. a. atayalica  (Shirôzu & Murayama, 1943) Taiwan
L. a. unicolor  Saigusa, 1993 Fujian
L. a. hainanensis Gu & Wang, 1997 Hainan
genus: Logania
Logania marmorata  Moore, 1884 
genus: Loxura
Loxura atymnus (Stoll, [1780])
L. a. continentalis Fruhstorfer, 1912 South China, Hainan, South Yunnan
genus: Luthrodes
Luthrodes galba (Lederer, 1855)
Luthrodes pandava (Horsfield, [1829])
L. p. pandava (Horsfield, [1829]) Taiwan
Luthrodes peripatria (Hsu, 1980)
genus: Lycaena
Lycaena phlaeas (Linnaeus, 1761)
L. p. hypophlaeas (Boisduval, 1852) Ussuri
L. p. chinensis (Felder, 1862) South Ussuri
L. p. flavens (Ford, 1924) Tibet
Lycaena helle ([Schiffermüller], 1775)
L. h. phintonis (Fruhstorfer, 1910) Amur
Lycaena standfussi (Grum-Grshimailo, 1891) Tibet, West China
Lycaena pang (Oberthür, 1886) Tibet, West China
Lycaena tseng (Oberthür, 1886) West China
Lycaena ouang (Oberthür, 1891) Yunnan
Lycaena irmae Bailey, 1932 Tibet
Lycaena li (Oberthür, 1886) West China
Lycaena svenhedini (Nordström, 1935) China
Lycaena dispar (Haworth, 1802)
L. d. rutila (Werneburg, 1864) Tian Shan
L. d. aurata Leech, 1887 Amur, Ussuri
Lycaena violaceus (Staudinger, 1892) North China
Lycaena splendens (Staudinger, 1881) Tian Shan
Lycaena alciphron (Rottemburg, 1775)
L. a. naryna  (Oberthür, 1910) Tian Shan
L. a. acutipennis Chou & Zhang, 1994 Xinjiang
Lycaena thersamon (Esper, 1784)
L. t. jiadengyuensis (Huang & Murayama, 1992) Xinjiang (Altai)
Lycaena solskyi Erschoff, 1874
L. s. fulminans  (Grum-Grshimailo, 1888) Tian Shan
Lycaena alpherakii (Grum-Grshimailo, 1888) Northwest China
Lycaena margelanica Staudinger, 1881
L. m. margelanica Staudinger, 1881 Tian Shan
Lycaena virgaureae (Linnaeus, 1758)
L. v. virgaureae (Linnaeus, 1758) Altai
L. v. virgaureola (Staudinger, 1892) Amur, Ussuri
Lycaena tityrus (Poda, 1761) Altai
Lycaena hippothoe (Linnaeus, 1761)
L. h. amurensis (Staudinger, 1892) Amur, Ussuri
Lycaena pavana  (Kollar, [1844]) 
Lycaena kasyapa  (Moore, 1865) 
genus: Mahathala
Mahathala ameria (Hewitson, 1862)
M. a. ameria (Hewitson, 1862) Chang Yang
M. a. hainani Bethune-Baker, 1903 South China, Hainan, Taiwan
Mahathala ariadeva Fruhstorfer, 1908
genus: Maneca
Maneca bhotea  (Moore, 1884)
M. b. unnanensis Yoshino, 2001 Yunnan
genus: Megisba
Megisba malaya (Horsfield, [1828])
M. m. sikkima Moore, 1884 South Yunnan
genus: Miletus
Miletus chinensis C. Felder, 1862
M. c. chinensis C. Felder, 1862 Yunnan, Southeast China, Hainan
Miletus mallus (Fruhstorfer, 1913)
M. m. gethusus (Fruhstorfer, 1915) South Yunnan
Miletus bannanus Huang & Xue, 2004 South Yunnan
Miletus archilochus (Fruhstorfer, 1913)
Miletus archilochus archilochus (Fruhstorfer, 1913)  Yunnan
M. a. guangxiensis Li, 1994 Guangxi
genus: Monodontides
Monodontides musina  (Snellen, 1892)
Monodontides musina musinoides  (Swinhoe, 1910)
genus: Mota 
Mota massyla  (Hewitson, 1869) Yunnan
genus: Nacaduba
Nacaduba pactolus (Felder, 1860)
N. p. continentalis Fruhstorfer, 1916 West China
N. p. hainani Bethune-Baker, 1914 Taiwan, Hainan
Nacaduba berenice (Herrich-Schäffer, 1869
N. b. leei Hsu, 1990 Taiwan
Nacaduba kurava (Moore, [1858])
N. k. euplea Fruhstorfer, 1916 South China
N. k. therasia Fruhstorfer, 1916 Taiwan
Nacaduba beroe (C. & R. Felder, [1865])
N. b. beroe (C. & R. Felder, [1865])
N. b. asakusa Fruhstorfer, 1916 Taiwan
Nacaduba takamukuana Matsumura, 1919 Taiwan
Nacaduba taiwana Matsumura, 1919 Taiwan
Nacaduba hermus Felder, 1860 
genus: Neolycaena
Neolycaena davidi (Oberthür, 1881)
N. d. davidi (Oberthür, 1881) Northeast China
N. d. tangutica (Grum-Grshimailo, 1891) Tibet
Neolycaena eckweileri Lukhtanov, 1993 Tian-Shan
Neolycaena submontana Zhdanko, [1996]Tian-Shan
Neolycaena baidula Zhdanko, 2000 Tian-Shan
Neolycaena medea Zhdanko, 1998 Tian-Shan
Neolycaena sinensis (Alphéraky, 1881) Tibet, Tian-Shan
Neolycaena olga Lukhtanov, 1999 Tian-Shan
Neolycaena rhymnus (Eversmann, 1832)
Neolycaena tengstroemi  (Erschoff, 1874)
Neolycaena iliensis (Grum-Grshimailo, 1891)
genus: Neopithecops
Neopithecops zalmora (Butler, [1870])
N. z. zalmora (Butler, [1870])
genus: Neozephyrus
Neozephyrus japonicus (Murray, 1875) Northeast China
N. j. regina  (Butler, [1882]) Amur, Ussuri
Neozephyrus coruscans (Leech, 1894) West China
Neozephyrus dubernardi (Riley, 1939) West China
Neozephyrus helenae Howarth, 1957 West China
Neozephyrus asahii Fujioka, 2003 Kouy Tcheou
Neozephyrus uedai Koiwaya, 1996 West China
Neozephyrus taiwanus (Wileman, 1908) Taiwan
genus: Niphanda
Niphanda fusca (Bremer & Grey, 1853)
N. f. fusca (Bremer & Grey, 1853) Amur, Ussuri, Northeast China
Niphanda asialis (de Nicéville, 1895)
N. a. marcia (Fawcett, 1904) Yunnan
Niphanda cymbia de Nicéville, [1884]
genus: Novosatsuma
Novosatsuma pratti   (Leech, 1889)  Chang Yang 
Novosatsuma collosa  K. Johnson, 1992 Kansu 
Novosatsuma matusiki K. Johnson, 1992 Tibet
Novosatsuma magnasuffusa  K. Johnson, 1992 Yunnan
Novosatsuma plumbagina K. Johnson, 1992 Shensi
Novosatsuma magnapurpurea  K. Johnson, 1992 Szechwan
Novosatsuma cibdela  K. Johnson, 1992
genus: Orthomiella
Orthomiella pontis (Elwes, 1887)
O. p. rovorea (Fruhstorfer, 1918) Yunnan
Orthomiella rantaizana Wileman, 1910 South China
Orthomiella sinensis (Elwes, 1887) South China
genus: Palaeophilotes
Palaeophilotes triphysina  (Staudinger, 1891) 
genus: Pamiria
Pamiria chrysopis  (Grum-Grshimailo, 1888)
Pamiria metallica  (C. & R. Felder, [1865])
Pamiria omphisa (Moore, [1875]) North China
genus: Patricius
Patricius felicis (Oberthür, 1886) Tibet
Patricius gaborronkayi (Bálint, 1997) Tibet
Patricius lucifera (Staudinger, 1867) West China
P. l. selengensis  (Forster, 1940)
Patricius lucifuga (Fruhstorfer, 1915) Tibet
Patricius lucina (Grum-Grshimailo, 1902) Songpan
Patricius themis (Grum-Grshimailo, 1891)
Patricius younghusbandi (Elwes, 1906) Tibet
genus: Petrelaea
Petrelaea dana (de Nicéville, [1884])
genus: Phengaris
Phengaris albida Leech, 1893 West China
Phengaris atroguttata (Oberthür, 1876)
P. a. formosana (Matsumura) Formosa
P. a. juenana (Forster, 1940) Yunnan
P. a. lampra (Röber, 1926) Yunnan
Phengaris daitozana Wileman
Phengaris arion (Linnaeus, 1758)
P. a. xiaheana (Murayama, 1991) Gansu
P. a. inferna (Sibatani, Saigusa & Hirowatari, 1994) Sichuan
Phengaris cyanecula (Eversmann, 1848)
P. c. ussuriensis (Sheljuzhko, 1928) Amur, Ussuri
P. c. obscurior  (Staudinger, 1901) Tian Shan
Phengaris arionides (Staudinger, 1887)
P. a. arionides  (Staudinger, 1887) Amur, Ussuri
Phengaris rebeli (Hirschke, 1904)
P. r. imitator (Tuzov, 2000) North Tian-Shan
P. r. kondakovi (Kurentzov, 1970) Amur, Ussuri, Northeast China
Phengaris teleius (Bergsträsser, [1779])
P. t. euphemia (Staudinger, 1887) Amur, Ussuri
P. t. chosensis  (Matsumura, 1927) South Ussuri
P. t. sinalcon (Murayama, 1992) China
Phengaris kurentzovi (Sibatani, Saigusa & Hirowatari, 1994)
P. k. kurentzovi (Sibatani, Saigusa & Hirowatari, 1994) Amur, Ussuri
Phengaris alcon (Denis & Schiffermüller, 1775)
P. a. alcon (Denis & Schiffermüller, 1775)
genus: Pithecops
Pithecops fulgens Doherty, 1889
P. f. fulgens Doherty, 1889 China
P. f. urai  Bethune-Baker, 1913 Taiwan
Pithecops corvus Fruhstorfer, 1919
P. c. correctus  Cowan, 1965 South Yunnan
genus: Plebejus
Plebejus eversmanni (Lang, 1884) Tian Shan
Plebejus argus (Linnaeus, 1758)
P. a. wolgensis (Forster, 1936) Tian Shan
P. a. clarasiaticus (Verity, 1931) Amur
P. a. coreanus Tutt, 1909 Amur, Ussuri
Plebejus agnatus (Rühl, 1895) Tian Shan
Plebejus argyrognomon (Bergstrasser, [1779]) Amur
Plebejus pseudaegon (Butler, [1882]) Northeast China
P. p. sinicus  (Forster, 1936) Sichuan
Plebejus christophi (Staudinger, 1874)
P. c. nanshanica (Forster, 1936) Kansu
Plebejus idas (Linnaeus, 1761)
P. i. tshimganus  (Forster, 1936) Tian Shan
Plebejus ganssuensis (Grum-Grshimailo, 1891) Amda, Kuku-Noor
Plebejus calliopis (Boisduval, 1832)
P. c. aegina (Grum-Grshimailo, 1891) Tian-Shan
Plebejus subsolanus (Eversmann, 1851)
P. s. subsolanus (Eversmann, 1851) Amur, Ussuri
P. s. sifanica (Grum-Grshimailo, 1891) Kansu, Tibet
Plebejus cleobis (Bremer, 1861)
P. c. tancrei (Graeser, 1888) Amur, Ussuri
Plebejus hishikawai (Yoshino, 2003) Tibet
Plebejus qinghaiensis (Murayama)
Plebejus samudra  (Moore, [1875])
Plebejus maracandicus  (Erschoff, 1874) 
P. m. planorum  (Alphéraky, 1881)
genus: Polyommatus
Polyommatus actinides (Staudinger, 1886)
P. a. praeactinides (Forster, 1960) Tian Shan
Polyommatus thersites (Cantener, 1834)
P. t. orientis (Sheljuzhko, 1928) Tian Shan
Polyommatus ripartii (Freyer, 1830)
P. r. colemani (Lukhtanov & Dantchenko, 2002) Tian Shan
P. r. sarkani (Lukhtanov & Dantchenko, 2002) West China
Polyommatus juldusa (Staudinger, 1886)
P. j. juldusa (Staudinger, 1886) Tian Shan
Polyommatus phyllides (Staudinger, 1886) Tian Shan
Polyommatus stigmatifera Courvoisier, 1903 Tian Shan
Polyommatus kamtshadalis (Sheljuzhko, 1933) Amur, Ussuri
Polyommatus forresti Bálint, 1992 Yunnan
Polyommatus tsvetaevi Kurentzov, 1970Ussuri
Polyommatus venus (Staudinger, 1886)
P. v. wiskotti (Courvoisier, 1911) Tian Shan
P. v. lama (Grum-Grshimailo, 1891) Amdo
P. v. sinina (Grum-Grshimailo, 1891) Kuku-Noor
Polyommatus magnifica (Grum-Grshimailo, 1885) Tian Shan
Polyommatus amandus (Schneider, 1792)
P. a. turensis (Heyne, 1895) Tian Shan
P. a. amurensis (Staudinger, 1892) Amur, Ussuri
Polyommatus hunza  (Grum-Grshimailo, 1890) 
Polyommatus icadius (Grum-Grshimailo, 1890)
P. i. candidus Zhdanko, 2000 Tian Shan
Polyommatus icarus (Rottemburg, 1775)
P. i. omelkoi Dubatolov & Korshunov, 1995 Amur, Ussuri
P. i. napaea (Grum-Grshimailo, 1891) Tian Shan
Polyommatus kashgharensis Moore, 1878
P. k. turanicus Heyne, [1895] Tian Shan
Polyommatus iphigenides (Staudinger, 1886) Tian Shan
Polyommatus everesti Riley, 1923 Tibet
Polyommatus eros (Ochsenheimer, 1808)
Polyommatus erotides  (Kurentzov, 1970)
P. e. gansuensisMurayama
Polyommatus kirgisorum  Lukhtanov & Dantchenko, 1994 
P. k. rueckbeili (Forster, 1960) 
Polyommatus damon  Denis & Schiffermüller, 1775 
Polyommatus erigone  (Grum-Grshimailo, 1890)
Polyommatus nuksani  (Forster, 1937)
genus: Porites
Poritia erycinoides (C. Felder, 1865) 
genus: Pratapa
Pratapa icetas (Hewitson, 1865)
P. i. icetas (Hewitson, 1865) West China, Tibet
P. i. extensa Evans, 1925 Yunnan
Pratapa deva (Moore, [1858])
P. d. devula Corbet, 1942 Hong Kong
genus: Prosotas
Prosotas nora (Felder, 1860)
P. n. nora (Felder, 1860) Yunnan
P. n. formosana (Fruhstorfer, 1916) Taiwan
P. n. ardates  (Moore, 1874) Yunnan
Prosotas lutea sivoka  (Evans, 1910) Yunnan
Prosotas aluta coelestis  (Wood-Mason & de Niceville, [1887]) Yunnan
Prosotas nora ardates  (Moore, 1874) Yunnan
Prosotas pia marginata  Tite, 1963 Yunnan
Prosotas bhutea bhutea  (de Niceville, [1884]) Yunnan 
Prosotas dubiosa indica  (Evans, 1925) Yunnan
genus: Protantigius
Protantigius superans (Oberthür, 1914) Central China
genus: Pseudozizeeria
Pseudozizeeria maha (Kollar, [1844])
P. m. maha (Kollar, [1844]) South China
P. m. diluta (C. & R. Felder, [1865]) Yunnan
genus: Qinorapala
Qinorapala qinlingana  Chou et Wang, 1995   
genus: Rapala
Rapala arata (Bremer, 1861) Amur, Ussuri, Northeast China
Rapala caerulea (Bremer & Grey, [1851]) Northeast China, Central China
Rapala suffusa (Moore, 1878)
Rapala dieneces (Hewitson, 1878)
Rapala manea (Hewitson, 1863)
Rapala varuna (Horsfield, [1829])
R. v. orseis (Hewitson, 1863) Yunnan
Rapala nissa (Kollar, [1844]) West China
R. n. ranta Swinhoe, 1897 Tibet
Rapala micans (Bremer & Grey, 1853) North China
R. m. haniae Huang, 2001 Yunnan
Rapala subpurpurea Leech, 1890 West China (Sichuan, Guizhou), Central China
Rapala nemorensis Oberthür, 1914 West China, Tibet
Rapala bomiensis Lee, 1979 Tibet
Rapala rectivitta (Moore, 1879) Yunnan
Rapala catena South, 1913 Tibet
Rapala selira (Moore, 1874)
Rapala pheretima (Hewitson, 1863)
Rapala refulgens de Nicéville, 1891
Rapala scintilla de Nicéville, 1890
Rapala iarbus (Fabricius, 1787)
Rapala takasagonis Matsumura, 1929 Taiwan
Rapala repercussa  Leech, 1890 Chang Yang
genus: Ravenna
Ravenna nivea (Nire, 1920)
R. n. nivea (Nire, 1920) Taiwan
R. n. howarthi Saigusa, 1993 Fujian
R. n. koiwayai Yoshino, 1997 Sichuan
genus: Remelana
Remelana jangala (Horsfield, [1829])
R. j. ravata (Moore, [1866]) South Yunnan
R. j. mudra (Fruhstorfer, 1907) Hong Kong
R. j. hainanensis (Joicey & Talbot, 1922) Hainan
genus: Rimisia
Rimisia miris (Staudinger, 1881) Northwest China
genus: Saigusaozephyrus
Saigusaozephyrus atabyrius  (Oberthür, 1914)
genus: Satyrium
Satyrium herzi (Fixsen, 1887) Amur, Ussuri, Northeast China
Satyrium spini  (Schiffermüller, 1775) 
Satyrium pruni (Linnaeus, 1758)
S. p. jezoensis (Matsumura, 1919) Amur, Ussuri
Satyrium latior (Fixsen, 1887) North China
Satyrium w-album (Knoch, 1782) Northeast China
S. w. sutchani  Tutt, 1907 Amur, Ussuri
Satyrium eximia (Fixsen, 1887) Northeast China, Central China
S. e. eximia (Fixsen, 1887) Ussuri
S. e. zhejianganum Tong, 1994 Zhejiang
Satyrium prunoides (Staudinger, 1887) Northeast China, Amur, Ussuri
Satyrium thalia (Leech, [1893]) Central China
Satyrium acaudata Staudinger, 1901 Tian Shan
Satyrium xumini Huang, 2001 Sichuan-Tibet border
Satyrium percomis (Leech, 1894) West China
Satyrium patrius (Leech, 1891) West China
Satyrium v-album (Oberthür, 1886) West China
Satyrium ornata (Leech, 1890) Central China, West China
Satyrium persimilis (Riley, 1939) West China, Yunnan
Satyrium dejeani (Riley, 1939) West China
Satyrium oenone Leech, [1893]
S. o. oenone Leech, [1893] West China, Tibet
S. o. minyonensis (Yoshino, 1999) North Yunnan
S. o. benzilanensis (Yoshino, 1999) Sichuan
Satyrium phyllodendri (Elwes, [1882]) Amur
Satyrium grandis (C. & R. Felder, 1862) North China, East China
Satyrium rubicundula (Leech, 1890) West China
Satyrium yangi (Riley, 1939) Kwantung
Satyrium kuboi (Chou & Tong, 1994) Zhejiang
Satyrium minshanicum Murayama, 1992 China
Satyrium neoeximia Murayama, 1992 Yunnan
Satyrium kongmingi Murayama, 1992 China
Satyrium pseudopruni Murayama, 1992 China
Satyrium volt (Sugiyama, 1993) China
Satyrium redae Bozano, 1993 China
Satyrium formosana  (Matsumura, 1910)
Satyrium tanakai  (Shirôzu, 1942)
Satyrium austrina  (Murayama, 1943)
Satyrium inouei  (Shirôzu, 1959)
Satyrium watarii  (Matsumura, 1927)
Satyrium esakii  (Shirôzu, 1941)
Satyrium lais  (Leech, 1892) 
Satyrium iyonis  (Oxta and Kusunoki, 1957)
Satyrium siguniangshanicum  Murayama, 1992 
Satyrium tamikoae  Koiwaya, 2002 Zhejiang
genus: Scolitantides
Scolitantides orion (Pallas, 1771)
S. o. orion (Pallas, 1771)
S. o. johanseni (Wnukowsky, 1934) Tan Shan
S. o. jezoensis (Matsumura, 1919) Amur, Ussuri
S. t. pauper Sugiyama, 1994
genus: Shaanxiana
Shaanxiana takashimai Koiwaya, 1993 Shaanxi
genus: Shijimia
Shijimia moorei (Leech, 1889)
S. m. moorei South Yunnan
S. m. taiwana Matsumura Formosa
genus: Shirozua
Shirozua jonasi (Janson, 1877) Amur, Ussuri, Northeast China
Shirozua melpomene (Leech, 1890) West China
genus: Sibataniozephyrus
Sibataniozephyrus kuafui  Hsu & Lin, 1994  Taiwan
Sibataniozephyrus lijinae  Hsu, 1995
genus: Sinia
Sinia lanty (Oberthür, 1886)
S. l. honei (Forster, 1940) West China, Tibet
S. l. pomena Huang, 1998 West Tibet, Southeast Tibet
Sinia divina (Fixsen, 1887) Amur, Ussuri
Sinia leechi  (Forster, 1940) 
genus: Sinocupido 
Sinocupido lokiangensis  Lee, 1963 Xinjiang
genus: Sinthusa
Sinthusa chandrana (Moore, 1882)
S. c. chandrana (Moore, 1882) West China
S. c. grotei  (Moore, [1884]) Yunnan
Sinthusa menglaensis (Wang, 1997) South Yunnan
Sinthusa rayata Riley, 1939 West China
Sinthusa zhejiangensis Yoshino, 1995 Zhejiang
Sinthusa nasaka (Horsfield, [1829])
Sinthusa rayata Riley, 1939 West China
genus: Spalgis
Spalgis epius (Westwood, 1852)
S. e. epius (Westwood, 1852) South Yunnan
S. e. dilama (Moore, 1878) Taiwan
genus: Subsolanoides
Subsulanoides nagata Koiwaya, 1989 
genus: Surendra
Surendra quercetorum (Moore, [1858])
S. q. quercetorum (Moore, [1858]) South Yunnan
Surendra vivarna (Horsfield, [1829])
genus: Tajuria
Tajuria caerulea Nire, 1920
Tajuria cippus (Fabricius, 1798)
T.c. malcolmi Riley & Godfrey Hainan
T. c. maxentius Fruhstorfer, 1912
Tajuria diaeus (Hewitson, 1865)
T. d. karenkonis Matsumura, 1929 Taiwan
Tajuria gui Chou & Wang, 1994 Hainan
Tajuria illurgis (Hewitson, 1869)
T. i. illurgis (Hewitson, 1869) Yunnan
T. i. tattaka (Araki, 1949) Taiwan
Tajuria luculentus (Leech, 1890)
T. l. luculentus (Leech, 1890) West China
T. l. taorana Corbet, 1940
Tajuria maculata (Hewitson, 1865)
Tajuria nanlingana  Wang & Fan, 2002 
genus: Taraka
Taraka hamada (Druce, 1875) West China, Central China
T. h. mendesia Fruhstorfer, 1918 Yunnan
Taraka shiloi Tamai & Guo, 2001 Sichuan
genus: Tarucus
Tarucus theophrastus (Fabricius, 1793)
genus: Teratozephyrus
Teratozephyrus arisanus (Wileman, 1909)
T. a.  arisanus (Wileman, 1909) Taiwan
T. a. picquenardi (Oberthür, 1914) Yunnan
Teratozephyrus zhejiangensis Chou & Tong, 1994 Zhejiang
Teratozephyrus hecale (Leech, 1894)
T. h. hecale (Leech, 1894) West China, Tibet
T. h. yugaii (Kano, 1928) Taiwan
Teratozephyrus tsukiyamahiroshii Fujioka, 1994 
Teratozephyrus hinomaru Fujioka, 1994
Teratozephyrus chibahieyukii Fujioka, 1994
Teratozephyrus tsangkie (Oberthür, 1886)  
Teratozephyrus nuwai  Koiwaya, 1996 
Teratozephyrus florianii  Bozano, 1996 
genus: Thaduka
Thaduka multicaudata Moore, 1878
genus: Thecla
Thecla betulae (Linnaeus, 1758)
T. b. betulae (Linnaeus, 1758) Amur, Ussuri
T. b. crassa Leech, 1894 Ussuri
T. b. elwesi Leech, 1890 West China, Central China
T. b. yiliguozigounae Huang & Murayama, 1992 Xinjiang
Thecla betulina Staudinger, 1887 Ussuri, Amur, Northeast China
Thecla ohyai  Fujioka, 1994 Yunnan, Li-Kiang.
genus: Thermozephyrus
Thermozephyrus ataxus (Westwood, 1851)
T. a. zulla (Tytler, 1915) West China
genus: Ticherra
Ticherra acte (Moore, [1858])
T. a. retracta Cowan, 1967 Hainan
genus: Tomares
Tomares fedtschenkoi  Erschoff, 1874 
genus: Tongeia
Tongeia fischeri (Eversmann, 1843) Northeast China, China
T. f. dea Zhdanko, 2000Amur
Tongeia filicaudis (Pryer, 1877) North China, West China
Tongeia ion (Leech, 1891) Sichuan, Tibet
T. i. ion (Leech, 1891) Sichuan, Yunnan
T. i. cratylus (Fruhstorfer, 1915)
T. i. cellariusi (Bollow, 1930) Gansu (Qinling Mountains)
Tongeia amplifascia Huang, 2001 Tibet
Tongeia pseudozuthus Huang, 2001 Tibet
Tongeia confusa Huang, 2003 Yunnan
Tongeia zuthus (Leech, [1893]) Sichuan, Tibet
Tongeia menpae Huang, 1998 Tibet
Tongeia davidi (Poujade, 1884) West China
Tongeia potanini (Alphéraky, 1889) Central China, Tibet
T. p. potanini (Alphéraky, 1889) South China, Central China, Tibet
Tongeia bella Huang, 2001 Tibet
Tongeia arcana (Leech, 1890) Chang Yang
Tongeia hainani  (Bethune-Baker, 1914)  Hainan
genus: Udara
Udara dilectus (Moore, 1879)
U. d. dilectus (Moore, 1879) West China, Central China
Udara albocaerulea (Moore, 1879)
U. a. albocaerulea (Moore, 1879) Yunnan
U. a. sauteri (Fruhstorfer, 1917) Taiwan
genus: Una
Una usta (Distant, 1886) Hainan, South Yunnan
genus: Ussuriana
Ussuriana michaelis (Oberthür, 1880) East China
U. m. michaelis (Oberthür, 1880) Ussuri, Northeast China
Ussuriana igarashii Wang & Owada, 2009 Guangxi
Ussuriana takarana  (Araki & Hirayama, 1941)  Taiwan
Ussuriana fani  Koiwaya, 1993 
Ussuriana takarana  (Araki & Hirayama, 1941) Taiwan
Ussuriana choui  Wang et Fan, 2000 
Ussuriana plania  Wang et Ren, 1999  
genus: Wagimo
Ussuriana fani Koiwaya, 1993
Ussuriana takarana (Araki & Hirayama, 1941) Taiwan
Wagimo signata (Butler, [1882]) Northeast China, Central China
W. s. quercivora (Staudinger, 1887) Ussuri
Wagimo sulgeri (Oberthür, 1908) West China
genus: Yamamotozephyrus
Yamamotozephyrus kwangtungensis (Forster, 1942)
Y. k. hainana (Koiwaya, 1993) Hainan
genus: Yasoda
Yasoda tripunctata (Hewitson, 1863)
Y. t. tripunctata (Hewitson, 1863) South Yunnan
Y. t. atrinotata Fruhstorfer, 1912 South China
Yasoda androconifera Fruhstorfer, 1912 South Yunnan
genus: Zeltus
Zeltus amasa (Hewitson, 1865)
Z. a. amasa (Hewitson, 1865) South Yunnan
genus: Zinaspa
Zinaspa zana  de Nicéville, 1898  Western China
Zinaspa distorta  (de Nicéville, 1887) 
Zinaspa todara  (Moore, [1884]) 
Z. t. karennia (Evans, 1925)  Yunnan
Zinaspa youngi  Hsu & Johnson, 1998 South China, Guangdong, Nan Ling National Reserve.
Zinaspa isshiki  Koiwaya 1989
genus: Zizeeria
Zizeeria knysna (Trimen, 1862)
Z. k. serica (Felder, 1862) Hong Kong
Zizeeria karsandra (Moore, 1865)
genus: Zizina
Zizina otis (Fabricius, 1787)
genus: Zizula
Zizula hylax (Fabricius, 1775)
Z. h. hylax (Fabricius, 1775)

References

Chou, I0 (ed) 1994. Monographia Rhopalocerorum Sinensium (Monograph of Chinese Butterflies). Henan Scientific and Technological Publishing House, Zhengzhou. (in Chinese). . Lists species plus new distribution records for China. New species descriptions are noted in English. Colour photographs of the species treated, with accompanying Chinese text.
Full list references.

External links
Catalogue of life China List provided by Chinese Academy of Sciences online here
Butterflies of China at Digital moths of Japan. Includes images.
Wikispecies taxonomy additional references via species or genus
Acta Zootaxonomica Sinica

Lists of butterflies of China